Mnatsakan Iskandaryan (born 17 May 1967) is a former Armenian Greco-Roman wrestler who competed for the Soviet Union and Russia. Iskandaryan is an Olympic Champion, three-time World Champion, and two-time European Champion. He earned the rank Honoured Master of Sports of the USSR in 1991 and was named Honoured Coach of Russia in 2000. In 2012, Iskandaryan was inducted into the FILA Hall of Fame as the sole Greco-Roman inductee. He's the second Armenian to be inducted into the Hall of Fame, after Armen Nazaryan.

Biography
Mnatsakan Iskandaryan started Greco-Roman wrestling in 1978 under the guidance of Koryun Movsesian. In 1987, he became an Espoir World Champion. Iskandaryan became a member of the USSR national Greco-Roman wrestling team in 1988. In that same year, he won a gold medal at the Wrestling World Cup team competition. Iskandaryan remained a member of the Soviet national team until the Union's fall in 1991. He won a silver medal in the 1989 European Wrestling Championships. In 1990, he moved to a heavier weight class, from lightweight (68 kg) to welterweight (74 kg), and won a 1990 World Wrestling Championships gold medal. In 1991, Iskandaryan became a European Champion and two-time consecutive World Champion. He repeated the European success by winning a 1992 European Championships gold medal for a consecutive second time. Ranked as the number one wrestler in his division for the past few years, Iskandaryan entered the 1992 Summer Olympics as the gold medal favorite.

Although Iskandaryan's home of Armenia was now independent, all of the former Soviet Olympians still competed together at the 1992 Olympic Games in Barcelona, under the Unified Team. Iskandaryan had single-handedly defeated all of his opposition, and thus claimed the Olympic gold medal and became an Olympic Champion.

Iskandaryan underwent over two years of inactivity following his Olympic victory. He finally returned, now serving under the Russian flag, at the 1994 World Wrestling Championships, where he claimed his third World Championship gold medal. Iskandaryan competed at the 1996 Summer Olympics in Atlanta. He was unable to win a medal and came in fifth place. Iskandaryan retired from wrestling after the 1996 Olympics and started coaching. As of 1996, he is the head coach of the national Greco-Roman wrestling youth team of Russia. In 2012, Iskandaryan was inducted into the FILA Hall of Fame, the sole Greco-Roman inductee. He became the second Armenian to be inducted into the Hall of Fame, after Armen Nazaryan in 2007.

References

External links
 
 Interview (in Russian)

1967 births
Living people
Sportspeople from Gyumri
Armenian wrestlers
Armenian male sport wrestlers
Soviet male sport wrestlers
Russian male sport wrestlers
Honoured Masters of Sport of the USSR
Olympic wrestlers of the Unified Team
Olympic wrestlers of Russia
Wrestlers at the 1992 Summer Olympics
Wrestlers at the 1996 Summer Olympics
Olympic gold medalists for the Unified Team
Olympic medalists in wrestling
Medalists at the 1992 Summer Olympics
World Wrestling Championships medalists
Russian wrestling coaches
Honoured Coaches of Russia
Soviet Armenians
Russian sportspeople of Armenian descent
European Wrestling Championships medalists